St Mary's Church in Whitkirk, Leeds, West Yorkshire, England is an active Anglican parish church in the archdeaconry of Leeds and the Diocese of Leeds.

History
A church on this site can be dated back to 1185; although the current church is of 15th century origin, it was extensively restored between 1855 and 1856. The chancel was rebuilt in 1901 by G. F. Bodley after which it remained largely unchanged until it was reordered in 1990.  It was Grade I listed on 26 September 1963.

Architectural style

Exterior
The church has a west tower with diagonal buttresses and carved obelisk pinnacles, a two light belfry and a lead-clad spire. There is a heavy nave with aisle parapets. The lychgate, officially opened on 26 June 1949 as a memorial to the dead of the two World Wars, was listed at Grade II in 1976. Stones from St. Paul’s Cathedral, Coventry Cathedral, St Martin-le-Grand Church in York, Leeds Town Hall and Leeds Museum were used in its construction.

Interior
The church has a short nave with octagonal piers. There is the recumbent tomb of Sir Robert Scargill and his wife with alabaster effigies above. On the North side of the chancel there is the tomb to engineer John Smeaton.

See also
List of places of worship in the City of Leeds
Grade I listed churches in West Yorkshire
Listed buildings in Leeds (Temple Newsam Ward)

References

External links

Official Website
A church near you St Mary Whitkirk

Whitkirk
Whitkirk
Whitkirk